Marc Gabriel Degryse (born 4 September 1965), nicknamed Le Lutin d'Ardooie ("The Imp of Ardooie") and The Little One, is a Belgian retired professional footballer who played as a forward.

In a 19-year professional career he played mainly for Club Brugge and Anderlecht (six seasons apiece), making his senior debuts at 17 and scoring nearly 200 official goals both clubs combined to win a total of ten major titles. He also competed briefly in England for Sheffield Wednesday.

A Belgium international for 12 years, Degryse represented the nation in two World Cups.

Club career
Born in Roeselare, West Flanders, Degryse played with equal success in the Belgian Pro League with giants Club Brugge and Anderlecht, moving to the latter in 1989 for a then-record €2.25 million and proceeding to win five national championships combined, three in a row.

He moved for £1.5 million to Sheffield Wednesday in the 1995 summer, but left after just one season as an important unit in helping the English club's eventual escape from relegation, after a 15th-place finish. During his time in South Yorkshire, he and teammate Orlando Trustfull had a cameo role in Sheffield-based film The Full Monty, but the scenes did not make the final cut.

In the following two campaigns Degryse played in the Netherlands with PSV Eindhoven, where he often struggled with injuries. He retired in 2002 at the age of nearly 37, after spells back in his country with K.A.A. Gent and Germinal Beerschot, having played 540 professional matches and scored 209 goals.

Degryse returned to Club Brugge as a technical director the following year, before he eventually resigned due to bad results in late January 2007, alongside longtime former teammate, coach Franky Van der Elst.

International career
On the international level, Degryse played 63 matches with the Belgium national team and scored 23 goals. He was summoned for the squads at two FIFA World Cups: 1990 and 1994, netting twice in seven games.

Degryse's debut came just one day after his 19th birthday, in a friendly with Argentina.

Career statistics

Club

International

Scores and results list Belgium's goal tally first, score column indicates score after each Degryse goal.

Honours 
Club Brugge
 Belgian First Division: 1987–88
 Belgian Cup: 1985–86
 Belgian Super Cup: 1986
 Bruges Matins: 1984

Anderlecht
 Belgian First Division: 1990–91, 1992–93, 1993–94, 1994–95
 Belgian Cup: 1993–94
 Belgian Super Cup: 1993
 European Cup Winners' Cup: runner-up 1989–90

PSV
 Eredivisie: 1996–97
 Johan Cruyff Shield: 1996, 1997
 KNVB Cup: runner-up 1997–98

Individual
 Man of the Season (Belgian First Division): 1987–88, 2000–01
 Belgian Golden Shoe: 1991
 Belgian Professional Footballer of the Year: 1987–88, 1989–90, 1994–95, 1999–2000
Sheffield Wednesday Player of the Year: 1995–96
 Belgian Fair Play Award: 2000–01, 2001–02
Goal of the Season: 2000
Golden Shoe Lifetime Achievement Award: 2001
Platina Eleven (Best Team in 50 Years of Golden Shoe Winners) (2003)

References

External links
Club Brugge archives 

1965 births
Living people
People from Roeselare
Footballers from West Flanders
Belgian footballers
Association football forwards
Belgian Pro League players
Club Brugge KV players
R.S.C. Anderlecht players
K.A.A. Gent players
Beerschot A.C. players
Eredivisie players
PSV Eindhoven players
Premier League players
Sheffield Wednesday F.C. players
Belgium international footballers
1990 FIFA World Cup players
1994 FIFA World Cup players
Belgian expatriate footballers
Expatriate footballers in the Netherlands
Expatriate footballers in England
Belgian expatriate sportspeople in the Netherlands
Belgian expatriate sportspeople in England